A compendium of previous efforts released on a four disk set.

Track listing

References

2005 compilation albums
Pigface albums